Hòa Bình is a township (Thị trấn) and town and capital of Hòa Bình District, Bạc Liêu Province, in south-western Vietnam.

References

Populated places in Bạc Liêu province
Communes of Bạc Liêu province
District capitals in Vietnam
Townships in Vietnam